Montana Highway 78 (MT 78) in the U.S. state of Montana is a state highway running in a northerly direction from an intersection with U.S. Highway 212  (US 212) at the city of Red Lodge. It runs through Roscoe and Absarokee.

History

Before receiving its present designation in 1978, MT 78 was designated as Montana Secondary Highway 307 (S-307).

Major intersections

See also

References

External links

078
Transportation in Carbon County, Montana
Transportation in Stillwater County, Montana